Better Off Dead is a 1985 American black comedy film written and directed by Savage Steve Holland. It stars John Cusack as high school student Lane Myer, who becomes suicidal after his girlfriend breaks up with him shortly before Christmas.

Plot
In the town of Greendale in Northern California, high school student Lane Myer's two main interests are skiing and his girlfriend of six months, Beth Truss. Shortly before Christmas, Beth dumps Lane for the handsome and popular captain of the ski team, Roy Stalin. Roy is an arrogant bully who unfairly rejects Lane at ski team tryouts. Beth also criticizes Lane's car, an old station wagon. Although Lane also owns a 1967 Camaro, he has not been able to get it running and it sits in the driveway in a dilapidated state.

Lane lives in a suburban development with his mother, Jenny, a ditzy housewife who routinely concocts creepy (and creeping) family meals; his genius little brother, Badger, who never speaks but at the age of "almost 8" can build powerful lasers and attract trashy women from "How-to" books; and his lawyer father, Al, who daily tries to stop the menacing paperboy, Johnny Gasparini, from breaking his garage door windows with thrown newspapers. Furthermore, Johnny claims that the Myers owe him two dollars for newspapers, and persistently hounds Lane, yelling "I want my two dollars!" Lane also regularly encounters two Korean drag racers, one of whom learned to speak English by listening to Howard Cosell.

Lane cannot get past Beth's rejection and decides that death is the only way out of his misery. He makes several half-hearted attempts at suicide, which all comically fail. With the help of his best friend, Charles de Mar (who in lieu of not being able to get "real drugs" in their "bodaciously small town," constantly inhales everyday substances like Jell-O, snow, and nitrous oxide from a whipped cream can), Lane tries to ski the K-12, the highest peak in town, in hopes of getting Beth back, but wipes out. Lane is further embarrassed when he gets fired from his humiliating fast food job at Pig Burgers in front of Roy and Beth, who are there on a date. To top it all, he increasingly begins to suffer from neurotic hallucinations owing to the mounting frustrations in his life.

As Lane attempts to either end his life or win back his ex-girlfriend, he gradually gets to know a new girl: a French foreign-exchange student named Monique Junot, who has a crush on him. She is staying with Lane's overbearing neighbor Mrs. Smith, who continually tries to force Monique into being a girlfriend for her socially awkward son Ricky.  The pair are so annoying that she pretends she cannot speak English.  Monique, a Los Angeles Dodgers fan, turns out to be an excellent auto mechanic and skier who helps Lane fix his Camaro and tries to build his confidence. When Roy insults Monique, Lane challenges him to a ski race down the K-12, with the winner to be captain of the ski team. Monique helps Lane prepare for the race, which he ultimately wins despite losing a ski and being pursued by Johnny. Beth rushes to embrace Lane at the finish line, but he rejects her and after besting Ricky (who attempts to keep Lane from rescuing Monique from the restraints of his mother) in a ski-pole swordfight, drives off with Monique in his Camaro. Lane and Monique are last seen kissing on home plate at Dodger Stadium, with Johnny bicycling towards them, while in a mid-credit scene Badger launches a homemade space shuttle from his room through the roof of the house.

Cast

 John Cusack as Lane Myer
 David Ogden Stiers as Al Myer
 Diane Franklin as Monique Junot
 Kim Darby as Jenny Myer
 Curtis Armstrong as Charles De Mar
 Amanda Wyss as Beth Truss
 Aaron Dozier as Roy Stalin
 Demian Slade as Johnny Gasparini
 Scooter Stevens as Badger Myer
 Yuji Okumoto as Yee Sook Ree
 Brian Imada as Chen Ree
 Laura Waterbury as Mrs. Smith
 Dan Schneider as Ricky Smith
 Chuck Mitchell as Rocko
 Vincent Schiavelli as Mr. Kerber
 Taylor Negron as Mailman
 Rick Rosenthal as Smitty
 E. G. Daily as Herself

Production
Parts of the film were shot in Alta, Brighton, and Snowbird in Utah.

The hand-drawn animation in the movie was animated by Savage Steve Holland’s collaborator Bill Kopp, who would later work with him on One Crazy Summer and Eek! The Cat. A dream sequence where hamburgers and fries come to life was produced in stop motion.

According to an interview with Diane Franklin on the RetroZest Podcast, actor Yano Anaya, who played one of Johnny Gasparini's paperboy gang members, also looped all of Demian Slade's dialogue as Johnny the paperboy. Anaya also played bully Grover Dill in A Christmas Story and young Michael Anthony in Van Halen's "Hot For Teacher" music video.

Reception
This was one of few films Siskel & Ebert featured (they gave two thumbs down) on their weekly television show, yet bypassed entirely in print publications (in either's respective Chicago newspapers). Bill Cosford of The Miami Herald wrote, "Better Off Dead has the body of a tired teen comedy but the soul of an inspired student film; it's the first movie in a long time to interrupt itself periodically with flights of animated fancy. At one point, romantic foreshadowing is accomplished by a 'clay-mation' sequence featuring cheeseburgers in love. At another, a lovesick teen draws a cartoon picture of his faithless girlfriend, and the drawing tells him to get lost."

According to Savage Steve Holland, Cusack did not like the film and walked out of a screening during the filming of Holland's One Crazy Summer (in which he also starred), later confronting Holland, saying Better Off Dead "was the worst thing I have ever seen. I will never trust you as a director ever again, so don't speak to me." Holland claimed that Cusack felt he had been made to look foolish and that his comments "made me not care about movies anymore". In a 2013 Reddit "Ask Me Anything" chat, however, Cusack was asked if he hated filming Better Off Dead, and responded, "No, I just thought it could have been better, but I think that about almost all my films. I have nothing against the film.... Glad people love it still."

On review aggregator Rotten Tomatoes, the film holds an approval rating of 77% based on 26 reviews, with an average score of 6.90/10. The website's critical consensus reads, "Better Off Dead is an anarchic mix of black humor and surreal comedy anchored by John Cusack's winsome, charming performance." On Metacritic, the film received a score of 51 based on 7 reviews, indicating "mixed or average reviews".

Soundtrack

The film's soundtrack was produced primarily by Rupert Hine.

The opening track, "With One Look (The Wildest Dream)", was produced by Hine and features Cy Curnin and Jamie West-Oram of The Fixx on lead vocals and guitars respectively. Hine had previously worked with Curnin and West-Oram, and also contributed vocals to the song. The following track, "Arrested By You", as well as "Better Off Dub (Title Music)" and "Race The K-12 (Instrumental)" were performed solely by Hine.

"Dancing in Isolation" features Terri Nunn of Berlin on lead vocals. Hine produced the song and was reportedly under consideration to produce an album for Berlin.

"Come to Your Rescue" was performed by Thinkman, a group formed by, and including, Hine for the purpose of restoring his solo career without the music press knowing about it. West-Oram also provided guitar work to this song, as well as the instrumental "The Falcon Beat".

The only two tracks on the CD without Hine's involvement are "A Little Luck" and "One Way Love (Better Off Dead)." Valley Girl Elizabeth Daily, credited on the soundtrack as E. G. Daily, sang lead vocals on both songs and also performed them in the film during the high school dance scene.

Track listing
 "With One Look (The Wildest Dream)" – 3:26 (written by Torrence Merdur/Rupert Hine)
 "Arrested By You" – 5:07 (written by Torrence Merdur/Rupert Hine)
 "Shine" – 3:49  (written by Martin Ansell)
 "Better Off Dub (Title Music)" – 3:48 (written by Rupert Hine)
 "Dancing In Isolation" – 4:04 (written by Torrence Merdur/Rupert Hine)
 "Come to Your Rescue" – 5:03 (written by Jeannette Obstoj/Rupert Hine)
 "A Little Luck" – 4:21 (written by Angela Rubin)
 "The Falcon Beat (Instrumental)" – 2:37 (written by Rupert Hine)
 "One Way Love (Better Off Dead)" – 3:33 (written by Steve Goldstein/Duane Hitchings/Craig Krampf/Eric Nelson)
 "Race The K-12" – 3:49 (written by Rupert Hine)
 Tracks 1–6, 8, and 10 produced by Rupert Hine.
 Tracks 7 and 9 produced by Steve Goldstein.

Personnel
Martin Ansell - guitar, vocals
Cellophane - keyboards
Cy Curnin - vocals, backing vocals
E.G. Daily - vocals, backing vocals
Bob Getter - bass
Steve Goldstein - keyboards
Matthew Harte - vocals, backing vocals
Rupert Hine - lead and backing vocals, all other instruments
Craig Hull - guitar
Leo Hurll - bass
Craig Krampf - drums
Trevor Morais - drums
Terri Nunn - vocals
Geoffrey Richardson - guitar
Chris Rodel - bass
Angela Rubin - backing vocals
Thinkman - vocals
Waddy Wachtel - guitar
Jamie West-Oram - guitar
Daniel Zimmerman - backing vocals

A number of songs that appear in the film do not appear on the CD soundtrack, including Howard Jones' "Like To Get To Know You Well", Van Halen's "Everybody Wants Some!!", Neil Sedaka's "Breaking Up Is Hard to Do", Paul Simon's "Fifty Ways To Leave Your Lover", Jimi Hendrix's "Foxy Lady", Frank Sinatra singing "A Man Alone" by Rod McKuen, Hall & Oates' "She's Gone", and Muddy Waters' "Mannish Boy".

Notes

References

External links

 
 
 
 
 Better Off Dead Camaro (restored)

1985 films
1980s black comedy films
1985 romantic comedy films
1980s teen comedy films
1980s teen romance films
American black comedy films
American films with live action and animation
American high school films
American romantic comedy films
American teen comedy films
American teen romance films
1980s English-language films
Films about suicide
Films directed by Savage Steve Holland
Films set in California
Films shot in Los Angeles
Films shot in Utah
American skiing films
Warner Bros. films
CBS Theatrical Films films
Student exchange in fiction
1985 directorial debut films
Films with screenplays by Savage Steve Holland
1980s American films
1980s high school films